Rock the Ocean's Tortuga Music Festival is an annual music festival held at Fort Lauderdale Beach Park in Fort Lauderdale, Florida. The festival is usually scheduled for early April  in Fort Lauderdale. 
Founded Rock The Ocean, the annual spring festival aimed to raise awareness and support for ocean conservation. A portion of the ticket proceeds goes to charity, and as of 2019 over $1,200,000 has been raised for ocean conservation.

The festival features multiple stages of live entertainment with a focus on country, rock and a variety of roots music. Past performers have included Zac Brown Band, Brett Eldredge, Eric Church, David Nail, Lynyrd Skynyrd and more.  More Recent performers have included Kenny Chesney, Luke Bryan, and Keith Urban as headliners.

Conservation Village
Each year, the festival features an area known as Conservation Village. The area holds interactive booths that contain games, exhibitions and displays with the focus of raising awareness of issues impacting the world's oceans and supporting marine research and conservation.  The festival also aims to raise money to protect sea turtles that nest annually along South Florida's Atlantic seaboard. Past Conservation Village partners have included: Nova Southeastern University Oceanographic Center, Broward County Sea Turtle Conservation Program, The Nature Conservancy, University of Miami Marine Conservation Program and many others. At the Conservation Village, the Guy Harvey Ocean Foundation has also worked to raise ocean awareness with marine life artist and conversationalist, Guy Harvey. More than 30 organizations have been issued over 1 Million in funds by the Rock the Ocean Foundation.

Festival Lineup By Year

COVID-19
Due to the COVID-19 pandemic in 2020 the Tortuga Festival, originally scheduled for April 17,18 and 19, 2020 was rescheduled to November 12, 13 and 14, 2021.

See also
List of country music festivals
Country music

References

External links
 Tortuga Music Festival website
 Rock the Ocean Foundation
 Huka Entertainment

Folk festivals in the United States
Rock festivals in the United States
Country music festivals in the United States
Music festivals established in 2013
Pop music festivals in the United States